Neerav Patel (2 December 1950 – 15 May 2019) was a Gujarati and English language poet, translator and editor; primarily known for his contribution in Gujarati Dalit literature such as Burning From Both The Ends (1980, English poems), What Did I Do To Be Black and Blue (1987, English poems) and Bahishkrut Phulo (2006, Gujarati). He edited Swaman, a journal of Dalit writings in Gujarati.

Biography 
Neerav Patel was born in Bhuvaldi, a village in Daskroi Taluka of Ahmedabad district, in the Indian state of Gujarat. His birth name was Somo Hiro Chamar. He changed his name to Neerav Patel because he faced atrocities due to casteism. He earned a PhD in English literature. He served as a Bank Officer. After his retirement, he devoted his time to Dalit literature.

He started writing poetry in college, in 1967. He wrote only Dalit poetry based on Dalit people who are suffering atrocities, exploitation, discrimination and segregation.

He pioneered the movement of Gujarati Dalit literature, publishing the first ever Gujarati Dalit literary magazine Akrosh in 1978 under the auspices of the Dalit Panther of Gujarat. He edited short-lived Gujarati magazines with others namely Kalo Suraj, Sarvanam, Swaman and Vacha.

He died on 15 May 2019 at Ahmedabad following cancer.

Works
Patel explored Dalit sensibility in his poems. He published two poetry collections in English, Burning From Both The Ends (1980) and What Did I Do To Be Black and Blue (1987). He published an anthology of Gujarati poems Bahishkrut Phulo in 2006. His other works are Severed Tongue Speaks Out (2014) and Wanted Poets (2019, posthumous).

Recognition
He received the Mahendra Bhagat Prize (2004–2005) from Gujarati Sahitya Parishad, and the Sant Kabir Dalit Sahitya Award (2005) from the Government of Gujarat.

See also
 List of Gujarati-language writers

References

External links
 Translated poems of Neerav Patel on Firstpost
 In Conversation with Neerav Patel (Interview of Neerav Patel in 'Le Simplegadi')

1950 births
2019 deaths
Poets from Gujarat
Gujarati-language writers
Indian male poets
Gujarati-language poets
People from Ahmedabad district
Indian magazine editors